New Addington Library is a public library in New Addington, South London. It stands in the London Borough of Croydon and is part of the Croydon Libraries arm of the council. The library was relocated to the New Addington Centre in 2013.

References 

Libraries in the London Borough of Croydon
Public libraries in London